Copa spinosa, is a species of spider of the genus Copa. It is endemic to Sri Lanka.

See also 
 List of Corinnidae species

References

Corinnidae
Endemic fauna of Sri Lanka
Spiders of Asia
Spiders described in 1896